The Johnson Road Covered Bridge is a covered bridge located near Petersburg, Jackson County, Ohio, United States.

It was built around 1870 by Robert W. Smith, using his 1867 patent for the Smith truss design. While most all of the covered bridges built in Jackson County in the 19th century used this design, this one is the only known example still standing in the state, and was listed on the National Register of Historic Places in 1984.

References

External links
 Johnson Road Covered Bridge at Bridges & Tunnels
 

Covered bridges in Ohio
National Register of Historic Places in Jackson County, Ohio
Bridges completed in 1870
1870 establishments in Ohio